Le Puy or Puy may refer to the following municipalities in France:

 Le Puy-en-Velay (also called Le Puy), in the Haute-Loire department
 Le Puy-Sainte-Réparade, in the Bouches-du-Rhône department
 Le Puy-Notre-Dame, in the Maine-et-Loire department
 Le Puy, Gironde, in the Gironde department
 Le Puy, Doubs, in the Doubs department
 Puy-Saint-Martin, in the Drôme department

See also
 Puy, a geological term used locally in the Auvergne, France for a volcanic hill
 Puy (society), a mediaeval society for the promotion of poetry and music, often through competitions
 Puy de Dôme, a dormant volcano in central France
 Puy-de-Dôme, a department in central France
 PUY, IATA code for Pula Airport, Croatia